John Johnston House may refer to:

John Johnston House (Sault Ste. Marie, Michigan), listed on the National Register of Historic Places (NRHP)
John S. Johnston House, Missoula, Montana, listed on the NRHP in Missoula County, Montana
John Johnston House (Yanceyville, North Carolina), listed on the NRHP in Caswell County, North Carolina

See also
John H. Johnston Cotton Gin Historic District, Levesque, Arkansas, listed on the National Register of Historic Places in Cross County, Arkansas
Johnston House (disambiguation)